Aphra trivittata is a moth of the subfamily Arctiinae. It was described by Francis Walker in 1854. It found in Brazil.

References

Moths described in 1854
Arctiinae
Moths of South America